Mikhail Petrovich Kirponos (12 January 1892 – 20 September 1941) was a Soviet general of the Red Army during World War II. Being accorded the highest military decoration, the Hero of the Soviet Union title, for the skill and courage in commanding a division in the 1939-1940 Finnish campaign, Kirponos is remembered for his leading role in the failed defense of Ukraine during the Battle of Brody, the Battle of Uman, and Kiev in the 1941 German invasion of the Soviet Union. He was killed by a landmine while trying to break out of the Kiev encirclement on 20 September 1941.

Early life
Kirponos was born in a poor peasant family and worked as a forester. He was conscripted in 1915 and took part in World War I. In 1917 he joined the Red Army, fought in the Russian Civil War, and joined the Bolshevik party in 1918.

In 1927 he graduated from the M. V. Frunze Military Academy. After graduation he was chief of staff of the 44th Rifle Division, then chief of the Supreme Soviet of the Tatar Autonomous Republic Kazan Military School from 1934 to 1939.

On 21 March 1940, he was awarded the title of the Hero of the Soviet Union for his actions during the Soviet-Finnish War. He became commander of the Leningrad Military District the same year.

World War II

In February 1941 he was assigned commander of the Kiev Military District, which was transformed into the Southwestern Front at the beginning of the German-Soviet War. On the night of 21 June 1941, the day before the launch of Operation Barbarossa by the Wehrmacht, Mikhail Kirponos disregarded the strict instruction from Stavka to ignore rumors of the pending invasion the next day and spent the night preparing mission orders for his command. That same night, the unfortunate D. G. Pavlov of the Western Front accepted Stavka's assertion that rumors of war were deception at face value and watched a comedy in Kyiv.

While his front-line units were under the Stavka's general order to treat any German attack as a likely provocation, and not to return fire, just as all other front line units of the Soviet armies of the frontier had been instructed, the armies of the Southwestern Front were alert, and had not been completely stood down. It is possibly because of this wary attitude of Kirponos and his staff that the Southwestern Front was not caught completely flat footed when the Germans attacked.

Disposition of forces for the Southwestern Front, and considerable terrain advantages also favored Kirponos in comparison to his counterparts in Byelorussia. In general, his command had more forces to deploy in depth, and von Runstedt's Army Group South only attacked with a single Panzer army, as opposed to two available to Army Group Center. Stavka in fact believed that Kirponos had enough forces under his command to effectively comply with Stavka's General Chief of Staff G. K. Zhukov's "Directive No. 3", which called for a counterattack by the Southwestern Front with the objective of seizing Lublin in German-occupied Poland. Kirponos and his staff were ambivalent about this ambitious proposal.

Shortly thereafter, Zhukov himself showed up at Southwestern Front headquarters at Ternopil with Nikita Khrushchev in tow, to personally direct the operation. The result was the ill-fated attack against the flanks of the 1st Panzer Group that was advancing toward Kyiv between the  5th and 6th armies, known as the Battle of Brody.

Severe communications, logistics and coordination problems plagued the operation, and as a consequence, the uncoordinated Mechanized Corps showed up late to their jump-off points in a disorganized fashion, without their complete complement of equipment and entered the battle piecemeal.

The fact that Zhukov and Kirponos were at odds about the offensive deepened these problems with Kirponos issuing a general order to cease the offensive on the 27th of June, because he wanted to make his front line shorter, "so as to prevent the enemy tank groupings from penetrating into the rear of the 6th and 26th Armies", according to H. Baghramyan.*  This order was quickly countermanded by Zhukov who ordered the attack resumed, an order that was promptly refused on the "personal responsibility" of the commander of the 9th Mechanized Corps, Konstantin Rokossovsky, leaving the commander of the 8th Mechanized Corps unaware that he was engaging alone.

Despite these difficulties, and the eventual loss of the great majority of the tanks involved in the fight, the German command was taken off guard.

Even though in the balance the Southwestern Front did comparatively better than the other Front commands in the frontier battles, and generally maintained organizational cohesion and some operational initiative, Nikita Khrushchev noted that Zhukov said "I am afraid your commander (Kirponos) here is pretty weak". Zhukov was soon forced to return to Moscow due to the critical situation developing along the Bialystok-Minsk-Smolensk axis, and the Southwestern Front, and newly formed Southern Front created on the basis of the Odessa Military District, were put under the umbrella of the "Southwestern Direction" commanded by Marshal Semyon Budyonny, a long time Stalin associate, in mid July, with disastrous results in the Battle of Uman.

Afterwards, Kirponos' forces fought in the Battle of Kiev. After his death, he was buried in the ravine in which had been dug to cover the breakout. Nevertheless, after the collapse of the Soviet Union, Kirponos remains highly regarded both in Ukraine and Russia for his exemplary military leadership, courage and valour. He became the highest ranked Soviet officer to die in direct combat. After the retaking of Kiev, he was reburied in Kiev, as his initial burial location was passed on by a group of infantry soldiers who successfully broke out while carrying his awards and documents.

In December 2022 the (Mikhail) Kirponos street in Kyiv, Ukraine was renamed to Vsevolod Petriv street.

Notes

References

Mikhail Kirponos at Warheroes.ru
The truth about the death of General M. P. Kirponos, Voenno-istoricheskiĭ zhurnal, 1964. № 9, ISSN 0042-9058
Serhiy Dehtiarenko, "To the sixtieth anniversary of the beginning of the Great Patriotic War, debts of our memoreis", Zerkalo Nedeli (The Mirror Weekly), June 16–22, 2001. in Russian, in Ukrainian.
Afrikan Stenin, "The feat of arms and the tragedy of the front commander", Zerkalo Nedeli (The Mirror Weekly), June 16–22, 2001. in Russian, in Ukrainian

1892 births
1941 deaths
People from Chernihiv Oblast
People from Nezhinsky Uyezd
Bolsheviks
Soviet colonel generals
Frunze Military Academy alumni
Ukrainian people of World War I
Russian military personnel of World War I
Soviet military personnel of the Russian Civil War
Soviet military personnel of the Winter War
Soviet military personnel of World War II from Ukraine
Heroes of the Soviet Union
Recipients of the Order of Lenin
Soviet military personnel killed in World War II
Deaths by explosive device